Steve Heremaia (born 23 June 1985 in South Auckland, New Zealand) is a retired New Zealand professional boxer. Heremaia is a former WBO Oriental middleweight Champion and peaked 14th on the WBO World rankings. Heremaia has never been knocked out let alone knocked down in his career. Heremaia is a former New Zealand National Amateur champion, winning his title in 2003.

Professional boxing titles
World Boxing Organisation 
WBO Oriental Middleweight Title (159¾ Ibs)

Professional boxing record

References

1985 births
Living people
Boxers from Auckland
New Zealand male boxers
Middleweight boxers